DeFuniak Springs Airport  is a public-use airport located two nautical miles (3.7 km) west of the central business district of the city of DeFuniak Springs in Walton County, Florida, United States. The airport is publicly owned and operated by the City of DeFuniak Springs and serves the general aviation transportation needs of the City and Walton County. In addition to private and recreational flying, the airport also supports business and corporate aviation. The airport is situated on 343 acres of land located approximately 2.5 miles west of the City's Central Business District.

References

External links

Airports in Florida
Airports in Walton County, Florida